Stokes' theorem, also known as the Kelvin–Stokes theorem after Lord Kelvin and George Stokes, the fundamental theorem for curls or simply the curl theorem, is a theorem in vector calculus on . Given a vector field, the theorem relates the integral of the curl of the vector field over some surface, to the line integral of the vector field around the boundary of the surface. The classical Stokes's theorem can be stated in one sentence: The line integral of a vector field over a loop is equal to the flux of its curl through the enclosed surface.

Stokes's theorem is a special case of the generalized Stokes theorem. In particular, a vector field on  can be considered as a 1-form in which case its curl is its exterior derivative, a 2-form.

Theorem

If a vector field  is defined and has continuous first order partial derivatives in a region containing , then

More explicitly, the equality says that

The main challenge in a precise statement of Stokes's theorem is in defining the notion of a boundary. Surfaces such as the Koch snowflake, for example, are well-known not to exhibit a Riemann-integrable boundary, and the notion of surface measure in Lebesgue theory cannot be defined for a non-Lipschitz surface. One (advanced) technique is to pass to a weak formulation and then apply the machinery of geometric measure theory; for that approach see the coarea formula.

A more detailed statement will be given for subsequent discussions. 
Let  be a piecewise smooth Jordan plane curve. The Jordan curve theorem implies that  divides  into two components, a compact one and another that is non-compact.

Proof
The proof of the theorem consists of 4 steps. We assume Green's theorem, so what is of concern is how to boil down the three-dimensional complicated problem (Stokes's theorem) to a two-dimensional rudimentary problem (Green's theorem).  When proving this theorem, mathematicians normally deduce it as a special case of a more general result, which is stated in terms of differential forms, and proved using more sophisticated machinery. While powerful, these techniques require substantial background, so the proof below avoids them, and does not presuppose any knowledge beyond a familiarity with basic vector calculus and linear algebra. At the end of this section, a short alternate proof of Stokes's theorem is given, as a corollary of the generalized Stokes's Theorem.

Elementary proof

First step of the elementary proof (parametrization of integral)
Let  and  be as in that section, and note that by change of variables

Second step in the elementary proof (defining the pullback)
The previous step suggests we define the function

then,

This is the pullback of  along , and, by the above, it satisfies

We have successfully reduced one side of Stokes's theorem to a 2-dimensional formula; we now turn to the other side.

Third step of the elementary proof (second equation)
First, calculate the partial derivatives appearing in Green's theorem, via the product rule:

Conveniently, the second term vanishes in the difference, by equality of mixed partials.  So,

But now consider the matrix in that quadratic form—that is, .  We claim this matrix in fact describes a cross product.
Here the "" represents the Matrix transpose operator.

To be precise, let  be an arbitrary  matrix and let

Note that  is linear, so it is determined by its action on basis elements.  But by direct calculation

Thus  for any .  

We can now recognize the difference of partials as a (scalar) triple product:

On the other hand, the definition of a surface integral also includes a triple product—the very same one!

So, we obtain

Fourth step of the elementary proof (reduction to Green's theorem)
Combining the second and third steps, and then applying Green's theorem completes the proof.
Green's theorem asserts the following: for any region D bounded by the Jordans closed curve γ and two scalar-valued smooth functions  defined on D;

We can substitute the conclusion of STEP2 into the left-hand side of Green's theorem above, and substitute the conclusion of STEP3 into the right-hand side.
Q.E.D.

Proof via differential forms
The functions  can be identified with the differential 1-forms on  via the map

Then one can calculate that

Thus, by generalized Stokes's theorem,

Applications

Irrotational fields
In this section, we will discuss the irrotational field (lamellar vector field) based on Stokes's theorem.

Definition 2-1 (irrotational field). A smooth vector field  on an open  is irrotational(lamellar vector field) if .

The Helmholtz's theorems
In this section, we will introduce a theorem that is derived from Stokes's theorem and characterizes vortex-free vector fields. In fluid dynamics it is called Helmholtz's theorems.

Theorem 2-1 (Helmholtz's theorem in fluid dynamics).  Let  be an open subset with a lamellar vector field  and let  be piecewise smooth loops. If there is a function  such that
 [TLH0]  is piecewise smooth,
 [TLH1]  for all ,
 [TLH2]  for all ,
 [TLH3]   for all .
Then,

However, "homotopic" or "homotopy" in above-mentioned sense are different (stronger than) typical definitions of "homotopic" or "homotopy"; the latter omit condition [TLH3]. So from now on we refer to homotopy (homotope) in the sense of theorem 2-1 as a tubular homotopy (resp. tubular-homotopic).

Proof of the  Helmholtz's theorems

In what follows, we abuse notation and use "" for concatenation of paths in the fundamental groupoid and "" for reversing the orientation of a path.

Let , and split  into four line segments . 

so that 

Let  be the image of  under .  That

follows immediately from Stokes's theorem.  is lamellar, so the left side vanishes, i.e.

Thus the line integrals along  and  cancel, leaving

On the other hand, so that the desired equality follows almost immediately.

Conservative forces
Above Helmholtz's theorem gives an explanation as to why the work done by a conservative force in changing an object's position is path independent. First, we introduce the Lemma 2-2, which is a corollary of and a special case of Helmholtz's theorem.

Lemma 2-2. Let  be an open subset, with a Lamellar vector field  and a piecewise smooth loop . Fix a point , if there is a homotopy  such that
 [SC0]  is piecewise smooth,
 [SC1]  for all ,
 [SC2]  for all ,
 [SC3]  for all .
Then,

Above Lemma 2-2 follows from theorem 2–1. In Lemma 2-2, the existence of  satisfying [SC0] to [SC3] is crucial;the question is whether such a homotopy can be taken for arbitrary loops. If  is simply connected, such  exists. The definition of simply connected space follows:

Definition 2-2 (simply connected space).
 [SC0']  is continuous,
 [SC1]  for all ,
 [SC2]  for all ,
 [SC3]   for all .

The claim that "for a conservative force, the work done in changing an object's position is path independent" might seem to follow immediately if the M is simply connected.　However, recall that simple-connection only guarantees the existence of a continuous homotopy satisfying [SC1-3]; we seek a piecewise smooth homotopy satisfying those conditions instead.

Fortunately, the gap in regularity is resolved by the Whitney's approximation theorem. In other words, the possibility of finding a continuous homotopy, but not being able to integrate over it, is actually eliminated with the benefit of higher mathematics.　We thus obtain the following theorem.

Theorem 2-2. Let  be open and simply connected with an irrotational vector field . For all piecewise smooth loops

Maxwell's equations

In the physics of electromagnetism, Stokes's theorem provides the justification for the equivalence of the differential form of the Maxwell–Faraday equation and the Maxwell–Ampère equation and the integral form of these equations. For Faraday's law, Stokes's theorem is applied to the electric field, :

For Ampère's law, Stokes's theorem is applied to the magnetic field, :

Notes

References

Electromagnetism
Mechanics
Vectors (mathematics and physics)
Vector calculus